Dianne Cagen is a West Indian former cricketer who played as a right-arm medium-fast bowler. She appeared in three One Day Internationals for the West Indies, all at the 1993 World Cup.

References

External links
 
 

Living people
Date of birth missing (living people)
Year of birth missing (living people)
Place of birth missing (living people)
West Indian women cricketers
West Indies women One Day International cricketers